Carolina Férez Méndez (born 26 June 1991), commonly known as Carol, is a Spanish footballer who plays as a forward for Primera División club Levante UD. She previously played for Espanyol and Barcelona.

Honours
Primera División (3): 2011–12, 2012–13, 2013–14
Copa de la Reina de Fútbol (4): 2009, 2011, 2013, 2014
Copa Catalunya (6): 2007, 2008, 2009, 2010, 2011, 2012

References

External links
 
 Profile at La Liga 
 Profile at Valencia CF 

1991 births
Living people
Spanish women's footballers
Primera División (women) players
Spain women's international footballers
RCD Espanyol Femenino players
FC Barcelona Femení players
Valencia CF Femenino players
Sportspeople from Sabadell
Footballers from Catalonia
Women's association football forwards
Sportswomen from Catalonia
Spain women's youth international footballers